William Raymond Green (November 7, 1856 – June 11, 1947) was a United States representative from Iowa, Chairman of the House Ways and Means Committee and later was a judge of the Court of Claims. His son, William R. Green Jr., served on the United States Board of Tax Appeals.

Education and career

Born on November 7, 1856, in Colchester, New London County, Connecticut, Green attended the public schools in Malden, Illinois and attended Princeton High School in Princeton, Illinois. He received an Artium Baccalaureus degree in 1879 from Oberlin College in Oberlin, Ohio and read law with McCoy & Pratt in Chicago, Illinois in 1882. He was admitted to the bar and entered private practice in Dow City, Iowa from 1882 to 1884. He continued private practice in Audubon, Iowa from 1884 to 1894. He served as a Judge of the Iowa District Court for the Fifteenth Judicial District from 1894 to 1911.

Congressional service

Green was elected as a Republican to the United States House of Representatives of the 62nd United States Congress to fill the vacancy caused by the resignation of United States Representative Walter I. Smith. He was reelected to the 63rd United States Congress and to the seven succeeding Congresses and served from June 5, 1911, until March 31, 1928, when he resigned to accept a federal judgeship. He was Chairman of the House Ways and Means Committee in the 68th through 70th United States Congresses.

Political philosophy

Green was considered a moderate Republican who worked well as Ways and Means Committee Chairman with President Calvin Coolidge's Secretary of the Treasury, Andrew W. Mellon. Mellon's primary legislative objectives during Green's tenure involved tax reductions.

Federal judicial service

Green was nominated by President Calvin Coolidge on February 20, 1928, to a seat on the Court of Claims (later the United States Court of Claims) vacated by Judge James Hay. He was confirmed by the United States Senate on March 12, 1928, and received his commission the same day. He assumed senior status on May 29, 1940. He assumed inactive senior status after June 1942, meaning that while he remained a federal judge, he no longer heard cases or participated in the business of the court. His service terminated on June 11, 1947, due to his death in Bellport, New York, where he had resided since taking inactive senior status. He was interred in Rock Creek Cemetery in Washington, D.C.

References

Sources

External links
 

1856 births
1947 deaths
People from Colchester, Connecticut
Judges of the United States Court of Claims
United States Article I federal judges appointed by Calvin Coolidge
20th-century American judges
Iowa state court judges
Republican Party members of the United States House of Representatives from Iowa
People from Bellport, New York
People from Audubon, Iowa